Bertrand Goulet (born November 20, 1944) is a retired politician from Quebec, Canada.

Background

He was born on November 20, 1944 in Saints-Gervais, Chaudière-Appalaches.

Political career

Goulet was elected as a Union Nationale candidate to the provincial legislature in the district of Bellechasse in the 1976 election against Liberal incumbent Pierre Mercier.  He served as his party's House Whip in 1980 and 1981.  He finished a close third and lost in the 1981 election against Parti Québécois candidate Claude Lachance.

References

1944 births
Living people
Union Nationale (Quebec) MNAs